The Cobb River is a river in the Tasman Region of New Zealand. It flows southeast from Lake Cobb on the northern slopes of Mount Cobb, in Kahurangi National Park, in the northwestern South Island. The river's waters are captured behind a dam to become the Cobb Reservoir; the outflow continues to join with the Tākaka River. The river is named for J.W. Cobb, a local mill owner.

Brown and rainbow trout are available for fishing in the river. A tramping track follows the river between Lake Cobb and the reservoir and there are several backcountry huts in the river valley. New Zealand's oldest rocks are found in the Cobb River catchment.

See also
List of rivers of New Zealand

References

Rivers of the Tasman District
Kahurangi National Park
Rivers of New Zealand